Kimberly Hutchings is Professor of Politics and International Relations at Queen Mary University of London. 

She is a leading scholar in international relations theory. She has extensively researched and published on international political theory in respect to Kantian and Hegelian philosophy, international and global ethics, Feminist theory and philosophy, and politics and violence. Her work is influenced by the scholarly tradition that produced the Frankfurt School and Critical Theory.

She is the author of Kant, Critique and Politics, International Political Theory: rethinking ethics in a global era, Hegel and Feminist Philosophy and Time and World Politics: thinking the present. Her current focus is on the areas of global ethics, assumptions about time and history in theories of international relations, and the conceptual relationship between politics and violence in Western political thought.

Prior to moving to Queen Mary in the summer of 2014, she worked as Professor of International Relations at the London School of Economics, acting as Head of Department from 2010 to 2013. She served as Reader at the same institution from 2003 to 2007. Hutchings was only the third woman to hold a professorial position in the Department of International Relations at the LSE (after Susan Strange and Margot Light) when awarded the position in 2007. From 1995 to 2002, she was Senior Lecturer in Political Theory at The University of Edinburgh's Graduate School of Social and Political Studies. Prior to that, she was a Lecturer in Philosophy in the School of Humanities and Social Sciences at the University of Wolverhampton.

She completed her PhD at the University of Sussex under the supervision of Gillian Rose.

Works 

Hutchings, Kimberley. "Feminist ethics and political violence." In: International Politics 44:1 (2007), pp. 90-106. 
Hutchings, Kimberley. "Feminist perspectives on a planetary ethic." In: The globalization of ethics. Edited by Sullivan, W.M.; Kymlicka, W. Cambridge University Press, 2007, pp. 171-190. 
Hutchings, Kimberley. "Happy anniversary! Time and critique in international relations theory." In: Review of International Studies 33, S1 (2007), pp. 71-89. 
Hutchings, Kimberley. "Simone de Beauvoir and the ambiguous ethics of political violence." In: Hypatia 22, no. 3 (2007), pp. 111-132. 
Hutchings, Kimberley; Frazer, E. "Argument and rhetoric in the justification of political violence." In: European Journal of Political Theory 6, no. 2 (2007), pp. 180-199. 
Hutchings, Kimberley. "Hegel, ethics and the logic of universality." In: Hegel: New directions. Edited by Deligiogi, K. Acumen, 2006, pp. 105-123. 
Hutchings, Kimberly. "Global Civil Society: Thinking Politics and Progress." In: Global Civil Society: Contested Futures. Edited by Baker, G.; Chandler, D. Routledge, 2005, pp. 130-148.
Hutchings, Kimberly. "Speaking and hearing: Habermasian discourse ethics, feminism and international relations." In: Review of International Studies 31, no. 1 (2005), pp. 155-165. 
Hutchings, Kimberly. "Subjects, Citizens or Pilgrims? Citizenship and Civil Society in a Global Context." In: The Idea of Global Civil Society: Politics and Ethics in a Globalizing Era. Edited by Germain, R. D.; Kenny, M. Routledge, 2005, pp. 84-99. 
Hutchings, Kimberly. "From morality to politics and back again: Feminist international ethics and the civil society argument." In: Alternatives 24 (2004), pp. 239-264. 
Hutchings, Kimberly. "World politics and the question of progress." Redescriptions: Yearbook of Political Thought and Conceptual History 8 (2004), pp. 211-234. 
Hutchings, Kimberly. "Feminism." In: Understanding Democratic Politics. Edited by Axtmann, R. Sage Publications, 2003, pp. 291-299. 
Hutchings, Kimberly. Hegel and feminist philosophy. Polity Press, 2003. 
Hutchings, Kimberly. "Feminism and Global Citizenship." In: Global Citizenship: A Critical Reader. Edited by Dower, N.; Williams, J. Edinburgh University Press, 2002, pp. 53-62. 
Hutchings, Kimberly. De-Beauvoir's Hegelianism: Rethinking the Second Sex. Radical Philosophy 107 (2001), pp. 21-31. 
Hutchings, Kimberly. "Ethics, Feminism and International Affairs." In: Ethics and International Affairs: Extent and Limits. Edited by Coicaud, J.-M.; Warner, D. United Nations University Press, 2001, pp. 194-216. 
Hutchings, Kimberly. "Feminist Philosophy and International Relations Theory: A Review." In: Women's Philosophy Review 27 (2001), pp. 31-60. 
Hutchings, Kimberly. "International Politics as Ethical Life." In: Ethics and International Relations. Edited by Seckinelgin, H.; Shinoda, H. Palgrave, 2001, pp. 30-55. 
Hutchings, Kimberly. "The Nature of Critique in Critical International Theory." In: Critical Theory and World Politics. Edited by Wyn Jones, R. Lynne Rienner, 2001, pp. 79-90. 
Hutchings, Kimberly. "Beyond Antigone: Towards a Hegelian Feminist Philosophy." In: Bulletin of the Hegel Society of Great Britain 41/42 (2000), pp. 120-131. 
Hutchings, Kimberly. "The Question of Self-Determination and Its Implications for Normative International Theory". In: Contemporary Review of International, Social and Political Philosophy 3, no. 1 (2000), pp. 91-120. 
Hutchings, Kimberly. "Towards a Feminist International Ethics." In: Review of International Studies 26, no. 5 (2000), pp. 111-130. 
Hutchings, Kimberly. "Feminism, Universalism and the Ethics of International Politics." In: Women, Culture and International Relations. Edited by Jabri, V.; O'Gorman, E. Lynne Rienner, 1999, pp. 17-37.
Hutchings, Kimberly. "Feminist Politics and Cosmopolitan Citizenship." In: Cosmopolitan Citizenship. Edited by Hutchings, K.; Dannreuther, R. Macmillan Press, 1999, pp. 120-142. 
Hutchings, Kimberly. International Political Theory: Re-thinking Ethics in a Global Era. Sage Publications, 1999. 
Hutchings, Kimberly. "New Thinking in International Relations." In: Theory and Society: Understanding the Present. Edited by Browning, G.; Halcli, A.; Webster, F. Sage Publications, 1999, pp. 191-204. 
Hutchings, Kimberly. "Political Theory and Cosmopolitan Citizenship." In: Cosmopolitan Citizenship. Edited by Hutchings, K.; Dannreuther, R. Macmillan Press, 1999, pp. 3-32. 
Hutchings, Kimberly. "Reason, Knowledge and Truth: Speculative Thinking and Feminist Epistemology." In: Women's Philosophy Review 23 (1999), pp. 5-33. 
Hutchings, Kimberly; Dannreuther, R (eds.). Cosmopolitan Citizenship. Macmillan Press, 1999.

External links 
Profile of Kimberly Hutchings at LSE
Department of International Relations at LSE

Year of birth missing (living people)
Living people
British political scientists
Academics of the London School of Economics
British international relations scholars
Academics of the University of Wolverhampton
Academics of the University of Edinburgh
Women political scientists